Lions Fountain is a fountain located in a park in the Yemin Moshe neighborhood  of Jerusalem, Israel.

The bronze and gold-plated, sculpted fountain was designed by the German sculptor Gernot Rumpf. It was installed in 1989.

The fountain is a popular summertime waterplay space for Jerusalem's children.

In popular culture
John Lyman's 2009 thriller, God's Lion, concludes with the protagonist landing a helicopter alongside the fountain.

See also
Israeli art
National parks of Israel

References

Fountains in Israel